Sadiq al-Mahdi (25 December 193526 November 2020), also known as Sadiq as-Siddiq, was a Sudanese political and religious figure who was Prime Minister of Sudan from 1966 to 1967 and again from 1986 to 1989. He was head of the National Umma Party and Imam of the Ansar, a Sufi order that pledges allegiance to Muhammad Ahmad (1844–1885), who claimed to be the Mahdi, the messianic saviour of Islam.

Personal life
Sadiq al-Mahdi was born on 25 December 1935 in Al-Abasya, Omdurman, Sudan.

He was the paternal grandson of Sayyid Abd al-Rahman al-Mahdi, founder of the Umma Party, and great-grandson of Muhammad Ahmad, the Sudanese sheikh of the Ansar and Mahdi who led the Mahdist War to reclaim Sudan from Anglo-Egyptian rule. He was also the paternal uncle of Sudanese-British actor Alexander Siddig.

Sadiq al-Mahdi married twice and had ten children, including a son named Siddig after his grandfather al-Imam al-Siddiq, born in 1968, who is now a leader in National Umma Party, and a daughter, Mariam, who is the leader of the National Umma Party.

Political life
Sadiq al-Mahdi was Prime Minister of Sudan on two occasions: first briefly in 1966–67 and second from 1986 until his ousting on 30 June 1989.

First term as prime minister (1966–1967)
After the 1965 elections, a coalition government was formed between the National Umma Party and the National Unionist Party.  Muhammad Ahmad Mahgoub of the Umma party became Prime Minister, and Ismail al-Azhari of the NUP became president. However, this coalition collapsed in October 1965 after the two parties failed to agree on control of the Ministry of Foreign Affairs. In July 1966, Prime Minister Mahgoub resigned after a parliamentary vote of censure.
Mahgoub's resignation split the Umma party into two factions: the opposition faction was led by Mahgoub and endorsed by Sadiq's uncle, the Imam al-Hadi al-Mahdi, while Sadiq led the faction that was willing to work with the NUP. As Sadiq's faction was larger, he became Prime Minister with NUP support. He supported regional development and greater autonomy for the southern provinces. These proposals were unpopular with many educated Sudanese civilians and army officers. In May 1967, Sadiq lost the support of his coalition partners, and Mahgoub returned as Prime Minister in a coalition with the National Unionist Party and the People's Democratic Party. In the 1968 elections, Sadiq's faction won more seats than Mahgoub's faction, but Sadiq lost his own seat to a candidate from Mahgoub's faction.

In the opposition (1967–1986)
Jaafar Nimeiry took power in Sudan through a coup on 25 May 1969.  After the attack on Aba Island in March 1970, Sadiq was imprisoned repeatedly by Nimeiry, finally going into exile in 1974.  From abroad, Sadiq formed an opposition organization known as the National Front.  In 1977, Sadiq and Nimeiry negotiated an agreement that freed 1000 political prisoners, granted amnesty to Sadiq, allowed nonpartisan opposition candidates in Parliament, and planned further democratic reforms. Sadiq then returned and started forming an opposition to Nimeiry's Sudanese Socialist Union.

Second term as prime minister (1986–1989)

After the 1986 elections, Sadiq formed a coalition government comprising the Umma Party (which he led); the National Islamic Front (led by his brother-in-law, Hassan Al-Turabi); the Democratic Unionist Party (led by Mohammed Uthman al-Mirghani al-Khatim); and four small Southern parties. However, this coalition proved to be unstable, preventing Sadiq from delivering on his promises to end the Second Sudanese Civil War and fix the ongoing economic crisis. On 30 June 1989, his government was overthrown in a coup led by Brigadier Omar al-Bashir. The post of Prime Minister of Sudan was then abolished.

1989 coup and afterwards

Sadiq continued to lead the Umma Party in opposition to Bashir after being ousted. He spent a period in exile, but eventually returned to Sudan in November 2000.  As a former head of government, he joined the Club of Madrid.

He ran unsuccessfully for the 2010 presidential elections, pledging not to hand Bashir to the International Criminal Court to face charges of crimes against humanity and war crimes on the grounds that it would destabilise the country.  In 2014, the government alleged that Sadiq had collaborated with rebels, forcing him to flee to Egypt. He eventually returned to Khartoum on 26 January 2017. 

In April 2019, Bashir was himself ousted by a coup after months of mass protests.  Sadiq affirmed his party's support for the protests and confirmed that they would not be part of any future civilian transitional government.  He also opined that Sudan should join the International Criminal Court and hand over Bashir to face charges.  In May 2019, Sadiq announced his retirement from electoral politics.

Death
On 26 November 2020, Sadiq died of complications from COVID-19, after being admitted to a hospital in Abu Dhabi, United Arab Emirates, for nearly a month.

Publishing career
He was the author of a variety of scholarly and political books, including The Southern Question (1964); Speeches in Exile (1976); Questions on Mahadism (1979); Legitimate Penalties and Their Position in the Islamic Social System (1987); Democracy in Sudan: Will Return and Triumph (1990); Challenges of the Nineties (1991). In addition to his political career, he is remembered for helping theorize and explicate "a new kind of religious thought which would draw out of the Qur’an and Hadith a shari‘a which was adapted to the needs of the modern world." Professor of History Albert Hourani characterizes Sadiq's intellectual contributions as "responsible but bold."

Education
 B.Sc philosophy and economics Oxford University
 M.Sc. politics Oxford University

See also
 First Sudanese Civil War (1955-1972) between North and South Sudan
 Second Sudanese Civil War (1983-2005), a continuation of the First
 Darfur Conflict (since 2003, ongoing as of 2020)

References

External links

Helen Chapin Metz, ed., "Umma Party", Sudan: A Country Study. Washington: GPO for the Library of Congress, 1991.

|-

1935 births
2020 deaths
Hashemite people
Al-Mahdi family
Leaders ousted by a coup
National Umma Party politicians
People from Omdurman
Prime Ministers of Sudan
Sudanese Sufis
Alumni of the University of Oxford
Deaths from the COVID-19 pandemic in the United Arab Emirates
Recipients of orders, decorations, and medals of Sudan